Ryan Craig is an ice hockey player.

Ryan Craig may also refer to:

Ryan Craig (playwright), British playwright